Reindeer Island may refer to:

 Reindeer Island, Lake Winnipeg, Manitoba, Canada
 Reindeer Island (Île aux Rennes), also known as Île Australia, Kerguelen Islands, Antarctic Ocean
 Reindeer Island, Alaska, United States of America; see List of islands of Alaska
 Reindeer Island, a 1960 children's book by Olive Price

See also
Reindeer (disambiguation)